Deborah Rhea Seehorn (born May 12, 1972) is an American actress and director. She is best known for playing attorney Kim Wexler in AMC's Better Call Saul (2015–2022), for which she was nominated for a Primetime Emmy Award for Outstanding Supporting Actress in a Drama Series at the 74th Primetime Emmy Awards. She also received another Emmy nomination for Outstanding Actress in a Short Form Comedy or Drama Series for her performance in Cooper's Bar.

She is also a two-time winner of the Satellite Award for Best Supporting Actress – Series, Miniseries or Television Film for her role as Wexler, in addition to receiving Screen Actors Guild Award and Critics' Choice Television Award nominations.

Early life
Deborah Rhea Seehorn was born in Norfolk, Virginia, on May 12, 1972. Her mother was an executive assistant for the United States Navy, while her father was an agent in the Naval Investigative Service. Her family moved frequently during her childhood, living in Washington, D.C. and Arizona, as well as in Japan. Following in the footsteps of her father and grandmother, she studied painting, drawing, and architecture from a young age. She continued pursuing the visual arts, but had a growing passion for acting and was introduced to contemporary theater in college.

Career

While in college, Seehorn was looking to get into theater, after the encouragement of her acting teacher. She worked many ancillary positions in the theater industry in D.C. to try to get noticed. She ended up getting some major roles in local theater productions, but still needed to take odd jobs to help make ends meet; she took roles in various industrial short instructional films. She soon started getting parts in more television productions, often playing roles that she considered as "very wry, sarcastic, knowing women", similar to her idol Bea Arthur. However, most of these roles were short-run series cancelled after one or two seasons.

In May 2014, Seehorn was cast in the Breaking Bad spin-off prequel series Better Call Saul (2015–2022), created by Vince Gilligan and Peter Gould. Seehorn portrays Kim Wexler, a lawyer and the eventual love interest of the titular Jimmy McGill / Saul Goodman (Bob Odenkirk). The series premiered on February 8, 2015. For her role, she has received widespread critical acclaim, won two Satellite Awards for Best Supporting Actress – Series, Miniseries or Television Film, one Saturn Award for Best Supporting Actress on Television out of two nominations, and received a nomination for the Primetime Emmy Award for Outstanding Supporting Actress in a Drama Series, two nominations for the Critics' Choice Television Award for Best Supporting Actress in a Drama Series and two for the Television Critics Association Award for Individual Achievement in Drama. In 2022, Seehorn made her television directorial debut with the fourth episode of Better Call Saul's final season ("Hit and Run").

Seehorn will play a starring role in Gilligan's next series after Better Call Saul, which was picked up by Apple TV+ for a two-season order in September 2022.

Seehorn's film credits include roles in the independent features Riders and Floating, and the independent shorts The Pitch, The Gentlemen, and The Case Against Karen. In 2021, she starred alongside Amanda Seyfried in the horror thriller film Things Heard & Seen. Her theater credits include the Broadway production of 45 Seconds from Broadway, as well as roles in The World Over, All My Sons, Stop Kiss, How I Learned to Drive, Freedomland, and Marat/Sade.

Personal life 

Seehorn married film producer and real estate agent Graham Larson in 2018, becoming the step-mother to his two sons from an earlier marriage.

She has gone by her middle name Rhea, pronounced similar to the name “Ray”, since childhood due to feeling a "disassociation" with the name Debbie from an early age.

Filmography

Film

Television

Video games

Awards and nominations

Notes

References

External links

 
 

1972 births
Actresses from Virginia
American film actresses
American television actresses
American women comedians
George Mason University alumni
Living people
Actors from Norfolk, Virginia
20th-century American actresses
21st-century American actresses
20th-century American comedians
21st-century American comedians